Adolfo Leoni (Gualdo Tadino, 13 January 1917 — Massa, 19 October 1970) was an Italian professional road bicycle racer. Leoni won many classic races before, during, and after the Second World War.

Major results

1937
 World Amateur road race champion
1939
Coppa Bernocchi
Giro del Veneto
Milano-Mantova
1940
GP Leptis Magna
Milano-Mantova
1941
Giro del Lazio
 Italian National Road Race Championship
1942
Milan–San Remo
Giro dell'Emilia
1945
Tre Valli Varesine
1946
Giro dell'Emilia
1948
Sassari-Cagliari
1949
Giro del Piemonte
1950
Tour de France:
Winner stage 2

External links 

Official Tour de France results for Adolfo Leoni

1917 births
1970 deaths
People from Gualdo Tadino
Italian male cyclists
Italian Tour de France stage winners
Cyclists from Umbria
Sportspeople from the Province of Perugia